The Najafgarh drain or Najafgarh nalah (nalah in Hindi means rivulet or storm water drain), which also acts as Najafgarh drain bird sanctuary, is another name for the northernmost end of River Sahibi, which continues its flow through Delhi, where it is channelized, and then flows into the Yamuna. Within Delhi, due to its channelization for flood control purposes, it is now erroneously called "Najafgarh drain" or "Najafgarh nullah." It gets this name from the once famous and huge Najafgarh Jheel (lake) near the town of Najafgarh in southwest Delhi and within urbanized Delhi. It is the Indian capital’s most polluted water body due to direct inflow of untreated sewage from surrounding populated areas. A January 2005 report by the Central Pollution Control Board classifies this drain, with 13 other highly polluted wetlands, under category ‘‘D’’ for assessing the water quality of wetlands in wildlife habitats.

This drain was widened as a flood control drain linking the Najafgarh lake to the river Yamuna, thus completely draining the once huge and ecologically rich Najafgarh Lake, famous for its wetland ecosystem, waterbirds and wildlife.

Classification and naming

Within the National Capital Territory of Delhi (NCT), this channelized waterway—misclassified, misnamed as a mere drain (Najafgarh drain or nullah)--is, in fact, the continuation of the Sahibi River and an elongation of the Najafgarh jheel Lake. During the 1960s and before, the rain-fed Sahibi River, which originates in the Jaipur District of Rajasthan, passing through Alwar District in Rajasthan and Gurgaon District in Haryana, entered Delhi near Dhansa and spilled its overflow in the Najafgarh Lake basin. This water then continued to flow on the other side, forming a tributary of the River Yamuna. In the following decades, this Sahibi River flow reaching the Dhansa regulators was channelized by digging out a wide drain and connecting it directly to the River Yamuna. This channelization also completely drained off the seasonal Najafgarh Jheel that had formed there previously. The channelized drain from Dhansa regulators to Keshopur Bus Depot on Outer Ring Road is wide with thick and high embankments. A vast amount of water is retained in this widened drain by closing the Kakrola regulators under Najafgarh Road to recharge the local ground watertable; hence it acts like an elongated lake as well.

Bird sanctuary and wetland

Wetland ecosystem and wildlife habitat important to migratory waterbirds and local wildlife

The drain has been much widened over the years to drain all the water which in earlier decades used to collect in the Nagafgarh Jheel basin; this was supposedly done to remove the threat of flooding in Delhi and now the drain itself acts as an elongated water body or lake with trees planted on both its embankments with an inspection road running on one embankment. During the winter months it attracts vast numbers of migratory birds and also supports local wildlife year-round. Due to the rich wildlife observed in and around the less polluted stretch of the drain outside of congested populated areas, it has been proposed as a bird sanctuary for Delhi.

The wetland ecosystem and wildlife habitat on several kilometers of less polluted Najafgarh drain in rural Delhi before entering the main city including the former Najafgarh lake or Najafgarh jheel area is very important habitat to migratory waterbirds as well as local wildlife and has been earmarked to be declared a bird sanctuary for Delhi. The area came to be recognized as an important wildlife habitat after a local naturalist studying the area during 1986–88 called attention to it recommending it to be conserved as a bird sanctuary after which the Delhi wildlife department posted 16 guards in the area to control illegal bird hunters including diplomats from various international embassies located in Delhi, India's capital. Delhi Administration officials were tasked with declaring about  stretch of the drain in rural Delhi, including where it passes through the core area of the now drained Najafgarh Lake, "protected" under the "Wildlife Act" after Lt.-Governor of Delhi Mr. H.L. Kapur was invited to the area for touring the site where he also heard accounts of local villagers about the rampant illegal hunting of waterbirds that went on here every year. The existing staff of the Flood Control and Irrigation Department numbering about 40 were also given the additional responsibility of protecting the wildlife on and around the drain.

Forested embankments
The Najafgarh drain has been much widened over the past decades and now has thick mud embankments on both its sides to channel the waters and protect Delhi from floods, these embankments have been planted with thick forest cover which serve as a much needed habitat for remnant local wildlife occurring in nearby and surrounding farmlands including common foxes, jackals, hares, wild cats, nilgai, porcupines and various reptiles and snakes including the dreaded cobras. Many local birds including waterbirds roost and nest in these trees.

Sections of the forested embankments of Najafgarh drain are currently classified as and are featured in Protected Forests and Recorded Forests (Notified Forest Areas in Delhi) as "M. P. Green area Najafgarh Drain (Tagore garden)", "Afforestation M.P.Green Area Najafgarh Drain (DDA)" and "Chhawla or Najafgarh drain city forest (29.64 Acre)".

Embankment road
There is a well kept drivable inspection road maintained by Irrigation and Flood Control Department of Delhi on one of the drains embankment throughout its entire length of several kilometers running through rural Delhi from Dhansa regulators at the southwest border of Delhi with the state of Haryana to where the drain crosses under the outer ring road at Keshopur bus depot near the Najafgarh road between the housing colonies of Vikaspuri and Tilak Nagar in New Delhi.

Bird-watchers and nature-lovers can view the wildlife and waterbirds occurring on the drain from vehicles by driving on this road and stopping intermittently and going down to the waters edge. As the width of the drain is limited the flocks of waterfowl and other waterbirds in the drain can be easily observed from the drain's edges and this same fact makes the birds much more vulnerable to hunting as they remain in easy reach of the poacher's shotguns and the nets and traps set for them by local villagers and professional trappers.

Recharging, irrigation
The continuous widening of the Najafgarh drain since the 1960s led to the complete draining of the once vast and rich Najafgarh lake, jheel or marsh which directly affected the ground water table in the entire surrounding region as all the rain water after yearly monsoons that used to collect in the vast lake basin in previous years now ran off swiftly through the widened drain into river Yamuna in which it outfalls, this has been affecting the entire climate of the region as well making the region more arid and creating water shortages for the purpose of irrigation or human consumption for the people of Delhi and surrounding regions.

Currently the drain is so wide and deep that it acts as an elongated lake in its own right and can hold and store a lot of rain water which can be regulated through regulators built into it at intervals. Maintaining of proper water-level in the drain and storage of rainwater in it during the summer months leads to recharging of ground water table which the surrounding farmers find much helpful as they access the high water table though tube wells dug on their farmlands though which they pump water to irrigate their crops. Farmers owning farmlands bordering the drain in rural Delhi directly use pipes and hoses to pump water from the drain for irrigation.

Fishing
The relatively cleaner portion of the drain in rural southwest Delhi before it enters densely populated and badly polluted area at Vikaspuri also attracts some small scale local village fishermen, occasionally one can be seen casting his line or net in the waters or floating on a black inflated truck tire tube spreading his fishing net across the breadth of the drain. A fishing license is needed to catch fish legally in Delhi waters.

Water hyacinth overgrowth
The water hyacinth, an introduced invasive species of fast growing floating plants completely clogs the open water surface of the drain in many areas annually and lot of funds and labour is employed by the flood control department to clear it some what to keep the water flow uninterrupted. The removing of the water hyacinth by laborers also opens up the water surface for birds and migratory waterfowl that take refuge here every winter.

Covering for development
There is a development scheme in the works where Najafgarh drain will be covered by the Flood Department from Vijay Nagar, Delhi to Hakikat Nagar and on the covered area shops will be built.

Najafgarh lake, marsh or jheel

Najafgarh lake, Najafgarh marsh or Najafgarh jheel (Jheel in Hindi means a lake) used to be a vast lake in the south west of Delhi in India near the town of Najafgarh from which it takes its name, it was connected to the river Yamuna by a natural shallow nullah or drain called the Najafgarh nullah. However, after the 1960s the Flood Control Department of Delhi kept widening the Najafgarh drain in the pretext of saving Delhi from floods and eventually quickly drained the once huge and ecologically rich Najafgarh lake completely. Rainwater accumulating in the Najafgarh lake or jheel basin had been recorded to have occupied more than 300 square kilometers in many years before its unfortunate draining.

However, with recent advances in ecological understanding it has become clear that draining of this vast lake affected the entire climate of this important region that is India's capital territory and its neighborhood. The draining of the lake completely also caused the watertable in the entire area to go down and the area becoming arid. There have been some plans since to at least resurrect a much smaller lake in the area. Most of the Najafgarh jheel basin lands have increased many folds in their value owing to them coming within Delhi, India's capital territory and are under ownership of farmers who may want to make a fast buck selling them to developers who want to convert the former lake basin into housing complexes as has already been happening with major housing colonies coming up in the region. If Najafgarh drain, which was built to drain the original Najafgarh lake or jheel, ever breaches its wide embankments it will flood these developed lands owing to them spread all over the former low lying jheel or lake basin.

Before draining, a vast lake

The lake was one of the last habitats of the famed and endangered Siberian Crane which has all but vanished from the Indian subcontinent now. Till before independence many British colonial Officers and dignitaries came in large parties for waterfowl hunting every season.

See also
 Najafgarh drain bird sanctuary, Delhi
 Nearby Najafgarh lake or Najafgarh jheel (Now completely drained by Najafgarh drain)
 Najafgarh town, Delhi
 National Zoological Park Delhi
 Sultanpur National Park, bordering Delhi in adjoining Gurgaon District, Haryana
 Okhla Sanctuary, bordering Delhi in adjoining Uttar Pradesh
 Bhalswa horseshoe lake, Northwest, Delhi

References

Further reading
 DRAFT MAP ZONAL DEVELOPMENT PLAN PLANNING ZONE- 'L'.
 SEWAGE PROJECTS to Prevent Untreated Sewage, 29 August 2011,  Ministry of Environment and Forests, Press Information Bureau, India
 Flood Problem due to Sahibi River, Department of Irrigation and Flood Control, Government of NCT of Delhi, India.
 WASTEWATER MANAGEMENT IN NAJAFGARH DRAINAGE BASIN – KEY TO WATER QUALITY IMPROVEMENT IN RIVER YAMUNA, by Asit Nema of Foundation for Greentech Environmental Systems1 and Dr. Lalit Agrawal of Tokyo Engineering Consultants, Japan2
 FLOOD CONTROL - The National Capital Territory of Delhi
 ‘Part of Najafgarh drain to be covered’, 12 September 2009, The Hindu
 How Sultanpur happened: Sultanpur and Najafgarh Jheels - by Peter Jackson, 
 ‘Reviving old ponds way out of water woes’, 9 August 2003, The Indian Express
 Action plans on polluted areas in Delhi soon, GN BUREAU, NEW DELHI, MARCH 17, 2010, Governance Now
 Proposal for ground water recharge in National Capital Region (NCR) by Dr. S. K. Sharma, Ground water expert,  
 , Delhi's Watery Woes by Arun Kumar Singh
 Birds are back at Najafgarh Jheel, 19 08 2010, Delhi Edition, Hindustan Times
 No more water-logging at airport with new drain in place, New Delhi, 17 December 2009, The Hindu
 Walls to be constructed around Najafgarh drain, New Delhi, 29 December 2006, Hindustan Times
 Groundwater to be recharged at Najafgarh, Mungeshwar drains, 10 March 2007, The Indian Express
 Gurgaon polluting Najafgarh drain, draws Minister's ire, by Rajesh Kumar, New Delhi, 27/07/2006, The Pioneer
 Winged visitors are back at Najafgarh Lake, New Delhi,  03/11/2011, Hindustan Times. Also see 
 CHAPTER J.- DESCRIPTIVE· pages from the Gazeteers, Delhi, 1912
 URBAN FLOODING AND ITS MANAGEMENT, 2006. India Disaster Management Congress.IIPA Campus, IP Estate, Near ITO Road, New Delhi. National Institute of Disaster Management, Ministry of Home Affairs, Government of India
 ACTION PLAN, ABATEMENT OF POLLUTION IN CRITICALLY POLLUTED AREA OF NAJAFGARH DRAN BASIN INCLUDING OKHLA, NARAINA, ANAND PARBAT AND WAZIRPUR INDL AREAS, DELHI POLLUTION CONTROL COMMITTEE, 4th Floor, ISBT Building, Kashmere Gate, Delhi-6, March, 2011
 BLUE DELHI DECLARATION, White Paper on: Aiming for Sustainability and Self Sufficiency in Delhi Water Management – Evaluating Delhi’s Current Water Assets vis a vis their Utilisation
 URBAN FLOODING DEMOGRAPHY AND URBANIZATION by Shashikant Nishant Sharma snsharma.phd[at]gmail[dot]com 11/1/2010, SCHOOL OF PLANNING AND ARCHITECTURE, Delhi
 Biodegradation of wastewater of Najafgarh drain, Delhi using autochthonous microbial consortia : a laboratory study. by Sharma G, Mehra NK, Kumar R. Source Limnology Unit, Department of Zoology, University of Delhi, Delhi-1 10 007, India.
 A search for archived News Articles on Najafgarh Drain on the India Envirinmental Portal website
 City to get its 1st bird sanctuary, 15/02/2005, Asian Age (New Delhi)
 New camp to jazz up tourism in city soon, 19 Apr 2010, Asian Age (New Delhi)
 Delhiites to cool off with aqua sports, New Delhi, 30 September 2007, Tribune News Service, The Tiribune, Chandigarh
 Proposal for groundwater recharge in National Capital Region - A report by SK Sharma and Green Systems, Submitted by samir nazareth on 22 April 2011, India waterportal - Safe, sustainable water for all

External links
 RECORDED FORESTS (NOTIFIED FOREST AREAS IN DELHI), Forest Department, Government of National Capital Territory of Delhi, India
 Tourism Infrastructure, Tourism department, Government of National Capital Territory of Delhi, India
 Irrigation & Flood Control Department, Government of National Capital Territory of Delhi, India
 Plantation/Greening of Delhi, Department of Environment, Government of NCT of Delhi, India
 facebook Topic: Delhi - Najafgarh Drain Birdwatching Report
 facebook: Checklist of the Birds of the Najafgarh Jheel Region - Including adjoining areas of Dhansa Barrage and the Najafgarh Drain in Delhi, by Sajit P. Mohanan
 A Search for: Najafgarh drain on the Google group "delhibirdpix"
 U-turn: Haryana will identify Najafgarh lake as wetland, TNN, Times of India, Jan 7, 2017

Drainage canals
Wildlife sanctuaries in Delhi
Rivers of Haryana
Rivers of Rajasthan
Rivers of Delhi
Tributaries of the Yamuna River
Yamuna River
Canals in India
Rivers of India